Hiroyuki Obata (born 31 March 1969) is a Japanese wrestler. He competed in the men's freestyle 130 kg at the 1988 Summer Olympics.

References

1969 births
Living people
Japanese male sport wrestlers
Olympic wrestlers of Japan
Wrestlers at the 1988 Summer Olympics
Sportspeople from Saitama Prefecture
Wrestlers at the 1994 Asian Games
Wrestlers at the 1998 Asian Games
Asian Games competitors for Japan
20th-century Japanese people
21st-century Japanese people
Asian Wrestling Championships medalists